Strathy Point Lighthouse is a remote former lighthouse located on the north coast of Sutherland, Scotland, and is situated on the coast close to the village of Strathy. Strathy Point was the first lighthouse in Scotland specifically built to be electrically operated. It was initially planned in 1953 and was completed by 1958. The lighting device itself was a two panel device with a focal length of 250mm with a 250watt light bulb, that gave a range of almost 26 miles. The lighthouse was originally fitted with a fog horn, which is no longer used.

The Station was fully automated in 1997 and was then telemetered from the Northern Lighthouse Board Headquarters in Edinburgh until it was decommissioned in 2012.

See also

 List of lighthouses in Scotland
 List of Northern Lighthouse Board lighthouses

References

External links
 Northern Lighthouse Board

Lighthouses completed in 1958
Parish of Farr
Lighthouses in Scotland